Ararat Rural City is a local government area in Victoria, Australia, located in the western part of the state.

It includes the towns of Ararat, Armstrong, Dunneworthy, Lake Bolac, Moyston, Pomonal, Streatham, Tatyoon, Wickliffe and Willaura. It was formed in 1994 from the amalgamation of the City of Ararat, Shire of Ararat and parts of the Shire of Mortlake and Shire of Stawell.

Ararat Rural City is governed and administered by the Ararat Rural City Council; its seat of local government and administrative centre is located at the council headquarters in Ararat. The Rural City is named after the main urban settlement located in the north of the LGA, that is Ararat, which is also the LGA's most populous urban centre with a population of 8,076.

Traditional owners 
The traditional owners of this are the Djab Wurrung.

Council

Current composition
The council is composed of seven councillors elected to represent an unsubdivided municipality. Composition as of September 2022:

Administration and governance
The Ararat Rural City Council meets on the third Tuesday of each month at 6pm in the Council Chamber at the Ararat Shire Hall, 239 Barkly Street, Ararat. The Ararat Municipal Offices, 59 Vincent Street, Ararat, is the location of the council's administrative activities. It also provides customer services at this location and is open from 8.15am to 5.15pm on week days.

Townships and localities
The 2021 census, the rural city had a population of 11,880 up from 11,600 in the 2016 census

^ - Territory divided with another LGA

See also
 List of localities (Victoria)

References

External links
Ararat Rural City Council official website
Metlink local public transport map
Link to Land Victoria interactive maps

Local government areas of Victoria (Australia)
Grampians (region)